Sarah Maureen Cochrane (born 23 September 1989) is an Australian weightlifter. She won the silver medal in the women's 64kg event at the 2022 Commonwealth Games held in Birmingham, England. She also won the silver medal in the women's 64kg event at the 2019 Pacific Games held in Apia, Samoa.

Early life 

Cochrane was born in Rockhampton, Queensland where she graduated from Glenmore State High School.  While living in Rockhampton, Cochrane reached top levels in women's artistic gymnastics while training at Victoria Park Gymnastics Club where she became a coach after achieving her own goals.

In 2008, Cochrane relocated with her family to Townsville where she worked as a coach for Gymnastics Townsville. She also became involved with CrossFit which is where her coach Bryce Knight first encouraged her to compete in weightlifting.

Cochrane graduated from James Cook University in 2012 with a degree in speech pathology.  She has established her own business which specialises in working with children and young adults who use augmentative and alternative communication.

Career 

Representing Australia as a weightlifter for the first time in 2019, Cochrane just missed out on a spot at the 2020 Summer Olympics.

She competed in the women's 64kg event at the 2021 World Weightlifting Championships held in Tashkent, Uzbekistan. She finished in 7th place in this competition. The 2021 Commonwealth Weightlifting Championships were also held at the same time and her total result gave her the gold medal in this event. As a result, she qualified to compete at the 2022 Commonwealth Games in Birmingham, England.

Achievements

References

External links 
 

Living people
1989 births
Sportspeople from Rockhampton
Australian female weightlifters
Weightlifters at the 2022 Commonwealth Games
Commonwealth Games medallists in weightlifting
Commonwealth Games silver medallists for Australia
21st-century Australian women
Medallists at the 2022 Commonwealth Games